José María Liu is a Taiwanese diplomat. He is currently the representative to Spain.

References

Living people
Ambassadors of the Republic of China to Paraguay
Ambassadors of the Republic of China to Panama
Representatives of Taiwan to Spain
Government ministers of Taiwan
Year of birth missing (living people)